Gowling WLG is a multinational law firm formed by the combination of Canada-based Gowlings and UK-based Wragge Lawrence Graham & Co in February 2016, in the first multinational law firm combination co-led by a Canadian firm. Gowling WLG ranks at number 16 in The Lawyer UK 200 2019. On the list of largest law firms by revenue, Gowling WLG ranked as the highest revenue producing firm in Canada and 74th in the world (US$587,140,000) in 2017.

History
Gowling WLG International Limited is an English company limited by guarantee, in which the two limited liability partnerships of Gowling WLG (Canada) LLP and Gowling WLG (UK) LLP are members. Legal services are provided by the two partnerships, which are financially separate. The structure is similar to the Swiss Verein structure used by several other major international law firms.

The firm co-sponsored the 10th Annual International Conference on Medical Regulation, which took place at the Ottawa Convention Centre in Ontario, Canada in October 2012.

Gowling WLG (UK) LLP acted as Official Legal Advisers and an Official Sponsor of the Birmingham 2022 Commonwealth Games, as well as Team England.

Offices

The firm has 19 offices in Canada, the UK, continental Europe, the Middle East, and China.

Notable professionals and alumni 

Leonard Walter Brockington (1888–1966).  Founding chairman of the CBC, 1936-1939
Gordon F. Henderson (1912–1993).  President of the Canadian Bar Association, 1979–1980; Chancellor of the University of Ottawa, 1991–1993
Roy McMurtry (born 1932). Attorney General of Ontario, 1975–1985 and Chief Justice of Ontario, 1996–2007
Ray Hnatyshyn (1934–2002).  24th Governor-General of Canada, 1990–1995
Ian Scott  (1934–2006). Attorney General of Ontario, 1985–1990
Donald Mazankowski (born 1935). Deputy Prime Minister of Canada, 1986–1993
Martin Cauchon (born 1962). Minister of Justice (Canada) and Attorney General of Canada, 2002–2003 ; Minister of National Revenue (Canada), 1999–2002
Lawrence Cannon (born 1947). Minister of Foreign Affairs (Canada), 2006–2008 and Stephen Harper's former Quebec lieutenant
Frank Marrocco. Associate Chief Justice (since 2005) of the Ontario Superior Court of Justice
Mark Ledwell, board director (2013–present), Canada–UK Chamber of Commerce

References

External links
 Official website

Law firms of Canada
Law firms of the United Kingdom
Law firms established in 2016